Water polo in Australia is governed by Water Polo Australia and its state based Water polo associations.

History
Behind Great Britain, Australia was the second nation in the world to play the game of water polo. The first known Australian match occurred at St Kilda Sea Baths, Melbourne on 3 March 1879 and was demonstrated by Professor Fred Cavill, who had only just emigrated from England. Australian men's teams have competed at every Olympic Games Water Polo Tournament since 1948, excepting 1968 (controversially not nominated by the AOC) and 1996 (did not qualify). Australia were the inaugural Olympic gold medallists at the first Women's Olympic Games Water Polo Tournament in Sydney (2000), and have since won two Olympic bronze medals at Beijing (2008) and London (2012).

Competitions
The Australian National Water Polo League is the national Water polo competition in Australia. It is organised by Water Polo Australia.

National teams
The Australia men's national water polo team and Australia women's national water polo team represent Australia in international competitions.

Water Polo Australia Hall of Fame
The Water Polo Australia Hall of Fame was established by Water Polo Australia in 2009 to honor players, coaches and officials who have contributed greatly to water polo in Australia.

See also

 Australia men's national water polo team
 Australia women's national water polo team
 Australian National Water Polo League
 Water Polo Australia Hall of Fame

References

External links